Cancún, often Cancun in English (without the accent;  or ) is a city in southeast Mexico on the northeast coast of the Yucatán Peninsula in the Mexican state of Quintana Roo. It is a significant tourist destination in Mexico and the seat of the municipality of Benito Juárez. The city is on the Caribbean Sea and is one of Mexico's easternmost points.

Cancún is just north of Mexico's Caribbean coast resort area known as the Riviera Maya.

Etymology and coat of arms

The name Cancún, Cancum or Cankun first appears on 18th-century maps. In older English-language documents, the city's name is sometimes spelled Cancoon, an attempt to convey the sound of the name.

Cancún is derived from the Mayan name , composed of  'snake' and the verb  ~  'to swell, overfill'. Two translations have been suggested: the first is 'nest of snakes' and the second, less accepted one is 'place of the golden snake'. Snake iconography was prevalent at the pre-Columbian site of Nizuc.

The shield of the municipality of Benito Juárez, which represents the city of Cancún, was designed by the Mexican-American artist Joe Vera.
It is divided into three parts: the color blue symbolizes the Caribbean Sea, the yellow the sand and the red the sun with its rays.

History

In the years after the Spanish conquest of Yucatán, much of the Maya population died or left as a result of disease, warfare, and famines, leaving only small settlements on Isla Mujeres and Cozumel Island.

Cancún is a planned city, created to foster tourism. When development of the area as a resort was started on January 23, 1970, Isla Cancún had only three residents, all caretakers of the coconut plantation of Don José de Jesús Lima Gutiérrez, who lived on Isla Mujeres. Some 117 people lived in nearby Puerto Juárez, a fishing village and military base.

Due to the reluctance of investors to gamble on an unknown area, the Mexican federal government financed the first nine hotels.

The city began as a tourism project in 1974 as an Integrally Planned Center, a pioneer of FONATUR (Fondo Nacional de Fomento al Turismo, National Fund for Tourism Development), formerly known as INFRATUR. Since then, it has undergone a comprehensive transformation from being a fisherman's island to being one of the two most well-known Mexican resorts, along with Acapulco.

Most 'Cancunenses' are from Yucatán and other Mexican states. A growing number are from the rest of the Americas and Europe. The municipal authorities have struggled to provide public services for the constant influx of people, as well as limiting squatters and irregular developments, which now occupy an estimated ten to fifteen percent of the mainland area on the fringes of the city.

Drug trafficking network

In the 21st century, Cancún had largely avoided the bloodshed associated with the trade of illegal drugs, but is known for its retail drug sales to tourists as well as for being a center of money laundering.
The links with Cancún date from the 1990s and early 2000s, when the area was controlled by the Juárez and Gulf drug cartels. By 2010 Los Zetas, a group that broke away from the Gulf Cartel, had taken control of many smuggling routes through the Yucatán, according to the U.S. Drug Enforcement Administration.

There have been violent acts in the city related to drug trafficking. Between 2013 and 2016 there were 76 murders: 31 in 2016, and at least 193 in 2017, the vast majority related to drug trafficking. Most have occurred in the urban nucleus, and there have been various violent episodes with firearms in the so-called "Zona Hotelera". Beginning in 2018 with a high wave of violence, Cancún is above the national average in homicides. In January 2018 alone there were 33 homicides, triple the number from January 2017.

The violent acts have begun to put pressure on the tourism industry, where in January 2019, Cancún saw its first decrease in international passengers in seven years.

Geography

City layout

Apart from the island tourist zone (part of the Mesoamerican Barrier Reef System), the Mexican residential section of the city, the downtown part of which is known as "El Centro", follows a master plan that consists of "supermanzanas" (superblocks), giant trapezoids with a central, open, non-residential area cut in by u-shaped residential streets.

Ave. Tulum is bisected by Ave. Cobá. East of Ave. Tulum, Cobá becomes Ave. Kukulcan which serves as the primary road through the 7-shaped hotel zone. Ave. Tulum ends on the north side at Ave. Paseo José López Portillo which connects to the main highway west to Chichén Itzá and Mérida. Another major north-south road is Ave. Bonampak which runs roughly parallel to Ave. Tulum. The main ferry to Isla Mujeres is located in Puerto Juárez, on Ave. Paseo José López Portillo.

Cancún's mainland or downtown area has diverged from the original plan; development is scattered around the city. The remaining undeveloped beach and lagoon front areas outside the hotel zone are now under varying stages of development, in Punta Sam and Puerto Juarez to the north, continuing along Bonampak and south toward the airport along Boulevard Donaldo Colosio. One development abutting the hotel zone is Puerto Cancún; also Malecon Cancún is another large development.

Climate

Cancún has a tropical climate, specifically a tropical wet and dry climate (Köppen Aw), with little temperature difference between months, but pronounced rainy and dry seasons. Unlike inland areas of the Yucatán Peninsula, sea breezes restrict high temperatures from reaching  on most afternoons.

The rainy season runs from May through late October, when hot temperatures, high humidity, and quick, but intense summer thundershowers are common. The dry season normally begins in December and runs through April, when more temperate conditions occur as the northeast trade winds bring northerly breezes, sunshine, and relative humidity is lowest. The hotel zone juts into the Caribbean Sea and is therefore surrounded by ocean keeping daytime temperatures around  cooler. Windspeeds are higher than at the airport located some distance inland, which is the official meteorological station for Cancún, averages as shown below.

Tropical storms and hurricanes

The tropical storm season lasts from May to December, the rainy season extends into January with peak precipitation in October. February to early May tend to be drier with only occasional scattered showers. Cancún is located in one of the main Caribbean hurricane impact areas. Although large hurricanes are rare, they have struck near Cancún in recent years, Hurricane Wilma in 2005 being the largest. Hurricane Gilbert made a devastating direct hit on Cancún in September 1988 and the tourist hotels needed to be rebuilt. In both cases, federal, state and municipal authorities were well prepared to deal with most of the effects on tourists and local residents. Hurricane Dean in 2007 also made its mark on the city of Cancún.

1988's Hurricane Gilbert was the second most intense hurricane ever observed in the Atlantic basin. It landed on the Yucatán peninsula after crossing over the island of Cozumel. In the Cancún region, a loss of $87 million (1989 USD) due to a decline in tourism was estimated for the months of October, November and December in 1988.

The hurricane's eye first passed over the island of Cozumel, and then made an official landfall near Playa del Carmen in the state of Quintana Roo at around 11 p.m. local time on October 21 with winds near . Portions of the island of Cozumel experienced the calm eye of Wilma for several hours with some blue skies and sunshine visible at times. The eye slowly drifted northward, with the center passing just to the west of Cancún, Quintana Roo.

Two years later after Hurricane Wilma, in 2007, Hurricane Dean made landfall as a Category 5 storm in Majahual,  to the south of Cancún. Fierce winds at the edge of Dean's impact cone stripped sand off  of beaches from Punta Cancún (Camino Real Hotel) to Punta Nizuc (Club Med).
The authorities asked tourism operators to suspend sending tourists to Cancún while Hurricane Dean was approaching, but did ask airlines to send empty planes, which were then used to evacuate tourists already there.

Attractions

Old Airport Control Tower Memorial
Despite being a young city, Cancún has a memorial monument of its foundation on a replica of the old Airport Control Tower that resembles to its own date of foundation. The original control tower was a provisional wooden structure, the work of Mexican architects Agustín and Enrique Landa Verdugo.

The old airport was located on the same part of the city that today corresponds to the Kabah Avenue. The tower is 15 meters tall, has a 45 step staircase and has a base dimension of 5 × 5 meters. The memorial was first built in 2002 with a donation by Aerocaribe, a local airline, but the structure was damaged after Hurricane Wilma in 2005. After pleas by the local people to rebuild the tower memorial, a new version was erected in 2010, which was later abandoned without proper maintenance until Woox Pinturas, a local wood maintenance company, made a donation to restore the structure to its original appearance.

El Ceviche Fountain
The real name of this monument is "Caribbean Fantasy," located in the heart of downtown Cancun, between the Coba and Tulum avenues intersection. It is the nerve center of the daily urban traffic of the city. It has witnessed multiple social and political events, undergoing constant repairs and remodeling for years.

Six years after Quintana Roo got recognized as the youngest state in the Mexican Republic and barely a decade after the city of Cancun was born, on October 22 and 23, 1981, the North-South Summit was held at the now defunct Sheraton Hotel. Two abstract pillars made of metal crossbeams gave the structure a stepped pyramidal appearance, with small masts displaying the flags of the countries attending the 1981 North-South Summit. The author, Lorraine Pinto, added details representing Quetzalcoatl on the sides, resembling the pyramid of Chichen-Itza, located in Yucatan.

In 1994, the municipal authorities of Cancun decided to demolish the commemorative structure because the city had been the scene of one of the most devastating climatic-environmental phenomena in the history of the Yucatan Peninsula, Hurricane Gilberto. The sculpture was irreversibly affected, leaving only the solid concrete base and the metal skeleton.

Due to its crosswise and bare appearance, the locals began to call it "Insectronic," a device manufactured by the Steren company to kill flies and mosquitoes. The municipal authorities decided to keep its base and the dynamics of the water fountain.

Once again, Lorraine Pinto was on call to create what locals began to call the Ceviche Fountain or the Ceviche Roundabout.

Maya archeological sites
There are some small Mayan vestiges of the pre-Columbian Maya civilization in Cancún. El Rey (Las Ruinas del Rey) is located in the Hotel Zone. El Meco, a more substantial site, is found on the mainland just outside the city limits on the road north to Punta Sam. 

Close by in the Riviera Maya and the Grand Costa Maya, there are sites such as Cobá and Muyil (Riviera) the small Polé (now Xcaret), and Kohunlich, Kinichná, Dzibanché, Oxtankah, Tulum, and Chacchoben, in the south of the state. Chichén Itzá is in the neighboring state of Yucatán.

Sports
Football club Atlante F.C. was founded in 1916 in Mexico City and moved to Cancún in 2007 due to poor attendance in Mexico City. In June 2020, speculation began about a possible move of Atlante F.C. back Mexico City. On June 26, the relocation became official. The same day, the relocation of Cafetaleros de Chiapas to Cancún was announced, with the team renamed Cancún F.C. They play in the Liga de Expansión MX, the Mexican second division, at the Estadio Andrés Quintana Roo. The city is also home to the Pioneros de Cancún of the Liga Premier de México, the third tier of Mexican football.

The Tiburones de Cancún (Cancún Sharks) were a professional American football team who played in the Fútbol Americano de México (FAM) league until the league's dissolution in 2022.

The city is also home to the baseball team Tigres de Quintana Roo, who play in the Mexican League (LMB).

Transportation 

Cancún is served by the Cancún International Airport with an added main runway that commenced operation as of October 2009. It has many flights to North America, Central America, South America, and Europe. It is located on the northeast of the Yucatán Peninsula serving an average of about fifteen million passengers per year. The airport is located around 20 km (12 mi) from the hotel zone, approximately a 20 minute trip by car. The island of Isla Mujeres is located off the coast and is accessible by ferry from Puerto Juárez and Playa Tortugas in the Hotel Zone.

Cancún is also served by three private bus lines that connect it to the downtown area and the "hotel zone" as well as more distant destinations such as Playa del Carmen and Tulum.

The Tren Maya, under construction , would connect Cancún to Palenque, Chiapas with intermediate stops on the Yucatán peninsula.

Sister cities
  Wichita, Kansas, USA – November 25, 1975
  Timișoara, Romania – March 5, 2019
  Naperville, Illinois, USA – February 5, 2021

See also

 Cancún Underwater Museum
Cenote

References

External links

  

 
1970 establishments in Mexico
Beaches of Quintana Roo
Populated coastal places in Mexico
Populated places established in 1970
Populated places in Quintana Roo
Port cities in the Caribbean
Seaside resorts in Mexico